Reiårsfossen is a  tall waterfall in Setesdal, Norway. The waterfall is located along the Norwegian National Road 9, just south of the village of Ose in the municipality of Bygland in Agder county. The waterfall flows down into a short stream before emptying into the northern end of the Åraksfjorden. The area, which contains several of creeks and rivers, was protected by law in 1973.

The legend 
Reiårsfossen got its name because one of the workmen's sons, Reiår (old spelling for Reidar), had fallen in love with a farm girl in Ose. To have her, the farmer had the condition that he should ride over the top of the falls three times. He did this, but the legend goes on to say that he wanted to take one more trip over the falls in honor of his upcoming wedding. This (fourth) trip, however, had fatal consequences, and both the horse and Reiår fell down and died.

Camping, fishing and country music 
The waterfall has become a tourist attraction and there is a public campground, Camp Reiårsfossen, just to the east on the shores of the Åraksfjorden. This campground holds annual festivals and events such as the Ose Country Festival (country music) and also a fishing festival.

There is a full-year toll road to the top of the falls and further inland to the lake Reiårsvann.

References 

Setesdal
Landforms of Agder
Waterfalls of Norway
Tourist attractions in Agder
Bygland